Srednyaya Sultanovka is a rural locality (a selo) in Sultanovsky Selsoviet of Volodarsky District, Astrakhan Oblast, Russia. The population was 96 as of 2010. There are 2 streets.

Geography 
Srednyaya Sultanovka is located 38 km southwest of Volodarsky (the district's administrative centre) by road. Nizhnyaya Sultanovka is the nearest rural locality.

References 

Rural localities in Volodarsky District, Astrakhan Oblast